Philippe Lab (born 13 July 1941) is a Swiss weightlifter. He competed in the men's lightweight event at the 1964 Summer Olympics.

References

1941 births
Living people
Swiss male weightlifters
Olympic weightlifters of Switzerland
Weightlifters at the 1964 Summer Olympics
Place of birth missing (living people)